Grevillea curviloba is a species of flowering plant in the family Proteaceae and is endemic to the south-west of Western Australia. It is a prostrate to erect shrub with short branchlets, divided leaves with linear to narrowly lance-shaped lobes with the narrower end towards the base, and white to cream-coloured flowers.

Description

Taxonomy
This grevillea was first formally described in 1845 by Carl Meissner who gave it the name Grevillea vestita var. angustifolia in  Johann Georg Christian Lehmann's Plantae Preissianae from specimens collected by James Drummond in the Swan River Colony. In 1986 Australian botanical taxonomist Donald McGillivray promoted the variety to species status, giving it the name Grevillea curviloba in his book New names in Grevillea (Proteaceae), the name Grevillea angustata having been given by Robert Brown to a different taxon in 1830.

In 1993, Peter M. Olde and Neil R. Marriott described two subspecies of G. curviloba in the journal Nuytsia and the names are accepted by the Australian Plant Census:

Distribution and habitat
Subspecies curviloba grows in open shrubland in a small area near Bullsbrook and subsp. incurva grows in winter-wet heathland near Muchea.

Conservation status
Grevillea curviloba subsp. incurva is listed as "Threatened" by the Western Australian Government Department of Parks and Wildlife, and an interim recovery plan has been prepared.

Use in horticulture
Grevillea curviloba is cultivated as an ornamental plant by plant nurseries, for use in gardens and drought tolerant landscaping.

References

curviloba
Eudicots of Western Australia
Proteales of Australia
Garden plants of Australia
Taxa named by Donald McGillivray
Plants described in 1986